Carefree is an unincorporated community in Crawford County, Indiana, in the United States.

Carefree has been noted for its unusual place name.

References

Unincorporated communities in Crawford County, Indiana
Unincorporated communities in Indiana